Porno Valley is a documentary series that aired from January 11, 2004 to April 4, 2004. This 13 part series follows the Vivid girls for 6 months. They present their work, their dreams and the daily life. They face the trouble in their relationships resulting out of their work, as well as the glamorous moments in their careers.

Everyone that has a name in the industry makes its appearance in this series along with some of the most popular girls at the time of production.

This show is also known under the title Vivid Valley in the UK, where it aired on Sky Television. In the US the series aired on Playboy TV and the Independent Film Channel (IFC).

Premise
This documentary series followed girls under contract with Vivid Entertainment.

Cast
Steven Hirsch
Sunrise Adams
Jenna Jameson
Nina Mercedez
Briana Banks
Savanna Samson

Episodes

See also 
 Family Business
 Pornucopia
 Wadd: The Life & Times of John C. Holmes
 Porn Star: The Legend of Ron Jeremy

References

External links
IMDb
World of Wonder
New York Times
Yahoo! TV

2004 British television series debuts
2004 British television series endings
2000s British documentary television series
2004 American television series debuts
2004 American television series endings
2000s American documentary television series
Sky UK original programming
English-language television shows
Playboy TV original programming
Television shows set in Los Angeles
Television series by Playboy Enterprises